Törökszentmiklósi Kézilabda Egyesület  is a Hungarian handball club from Törökszentmiklós, that plays in the  Nemzeti Bajnokság I/B, the second level championship in Hungary.

Naming history
2001–2009: Törökszentmiklósi KE
2009–2014: Claas-Törökszentmiklósi KE
2014–present: Arago Törökszentmiklósi KE

Kits

Team

Current squad
Squad for the 2015–16 season

Goalkeepers

Wingers

Pivots
 

Back players

Staff members
 Head Coach: 
  Assistant Coach: 
  Club Doctor: , MD
  Masseur:

Previous Squads

References

External links
 Official website

Hungarian handball clubs
Jász-Nagykun-Szolnok County